Philip Hubert Kendal Jerrold Harben (17 October 1906 – 27 April 1970) was an English cook, recognised as the first TV celebrity chef.

Biography

Harben was born in Fulham, London, and was educated at Highgate School. His mother, Mary Jerrold, was an actress known for her performance as the murderous Martha Brewster in the first stage production of Arsenic and Old Lace as well as many screen roles. His father, Hubert Harben, was a stage actor. His sister, Joan Harben, played Miss Mona Lott in the BBC Radio series It's That Man Again (ITMA). He learned to cook at the side of his parents, and "could scramble eggs and make mayonnaise long before I could read Thucydides or solve a quadratic equation".

His first occupation was as a commercial photographer. He was then engaged to run the kitchen of the Isobar restaurant in the Isokon building in Hampstead, London from 1937 to 1940, when he enlisted in the Royal Air Force, but an eye injury put an end to his flying career and he was assigned to the Army Catering Corps.

He compered a BBC wireless cookery programme from 1942, then a BBC TV programme, Cookery, from 1946 to 1951, followed by Cookery Lesson (with co-presenter Marguerite Patten) and What's Cooking from 1956.  His emphasis was always on method and principles rather than recipes, but he could be remarkably dogmatic – "The Pot to the Kettle not the Kettle to the Pot!".

Philip Harben can be credited with the first TV "moment" when on live television he cracked an egg that was so bad he had to abandon the recipe while he and the studio crew broke into helpless laughter.

He had a regular column in the British Woman's Own magazine in the 1950s.

In 1958, he helped found the Harbenware kitchen utensils company which, in 2020, is still operating under the same ownership.

He died on 27 April 1970, aged 63, and was buried on the west side of London's Highgate Cemetery.

Other appearances
He appeared as himself in the film Meet Mr. Lucifer (1953), instantly recognisable by his educated accent, expansive manner, ample girth and neatly trimmed beard (and in his trademark black and white striped apron).
He appeared as himself in the Norman Wisdom film Man of the Moment (1955), in which Wisdom interrupts his television appearance while being chased by crooks.
 He appeared as a contestant on the American panel game show What's My Line on a 25 March 1956 episode. He also previously appeared as a panellist on the UK version.

References in popular culture
In Terence Rattigan's play Separate Tables: Table Number Seven, Mr. Fowler, Lady Matheson and Mrs Railton-Bell leave the table in distress to watch "dear Philip Harben".

Publications
The Way to Cook, London: John Lane, The Bodley Head, 1945
Cooking Quickly, London: John Lane, The Bodley Head, 1946
Entertaining at Home (with Katharine Harben), London: Bodley Head, 1951
Television Cooking Book London: Oldhams Press, 1951
The Pocket Book of Modern Cooking, News of the World, 1951
The Young Cook, London: Peter Nevill, 1952
Cooking with Harben (ed. Katharine Harben), London: Herbert Jenkins, 1953
Traditional Dishes of Britain, London: Bodley Head, 1953
Philip Harben's Cookery Encyclopedia, London: Odhams, 1955
The Teen-age Cook, London: Arco 1957
Best Dishes from Europe, London: Arco, 1958
Best Quick Supper Dishes, London: Arco, 1958
Best Party Dishes 1958
Cooking, Penguin, 1960
Philip Harben's Book of the Frying Pan, London: Bodley Head, 1960
Imperial Frying with Philip Harben, London: Bodley Head, 1961
The Grammar of Cookery, London: Penguin, 1965
The Way I Cook, London: Frewin, 1965
The Tools of Cookery, London: Hodder Paperbacks, 1968. 
Cooking Quickly, Brighton: Clifton Books, 1969. 
Philip Harben's Count Down Cookery, London: Dent, 1971.

References

Sources
 
 "Philip Harben", Cooksinfo.com
 "Cookery Programmes", Whirligig-tv

1906 births
1970 deaths
Burials at Highgate Cemetery
People educated at Highgate School
English chefs
English television chefs
People from Fulham
Royal Air Force personnel of World War II
British Army personnel of World War II
Army Catering Corps soldiers